Sarah Aaronsohn (5 January 1890 – 9 October 1917) was a member of Nili, a ring of Jewish spies working for the British in World War I, and a sister of agronomist Aaron Aaronsohn. She is often referred to as the "heroine of Nili."

Biography

Sarah Aaronsohn was born in Zichron Yaakov, which at the time was part of Ottoman Syria. Her parents were Zionists from Romania who had come to Ottoman Palestine as some of the first settlers of the First Aliyah and were founders of the moshava where Aaronsohn was born. Encouraged by her brother Aaron, she studied languages and was fluent in Hebrew, Yiddish, Turkish and French, had reasonable command of Arabic and taught herself English. On 31 March 1914, she was married in Atlit to Haim Abraham, an older and affluent merchant from Bulgaria, and lived briefly with him in Istanbul; but the marriage was an unhappy one and she returned home to Zichron Yaakov in December 1915.

On her way from Istanbul to Haifa, Aaronsohn witnessed part of the Armenian genocide.  She testified to seeing hundreds of bodies of Armenian men, women, children, and babies; sick Armenians being loaded onto trains; with the dead being tossed out and replaced by the living. After her trip to Haifa, any allusions to Armenians upset her greatly. According to Chaim Herzog, Aaronsohn decided to assist British forces as a result of what she had witnessed.

Pro-British espionage

Aaronsohn, her sister Rivka Aaronsohn, and her brothers Aaron Aaronsohn and Alexander Aaronsohn, with their friend (and fiancé of Rivka) Avshalom Feinberg formed and led the Nili spy organization. Aaronsohn oversaw operations in Palestine of the spy ring and passed information to British agents offshore. Sometimes she travelled widely through Ottoman territory collecting information useful to the British, and brought it directly to them in Egypt. In 1917, her brother Alex urged her to remain in British-controlled Egypt, expecting hostilities from Ottoman authorities; but Aaronsohn returned to Zichron Yaakov to continue Nili activities. Nili developed into the largest pro-British espionage network in the Middle East, with a network of about 40 spies.

Torture and suicide

In September 1917, the Ottomans intercepted her carrier pigeon carrying a message to the British and decrypted the Nili code. In October, the Ottomans surrounded Zichron Yaakov and arrested numerous people, including Aaronsohn. Her captors tortured her father in front of her. She endured four days of torture herself, but she gave no information beyond what she thought of her torturers. Before she was to be transferred to Damascus for further torture, she asked permission to return to her home in Zichron Yaakov to change her blood-stained clothes. While there, she managed to shoot herself with a pistol concealed under a tile in the bathroom.  According to Scott Anderson, in his book Lawrence in Arabia, Aaronsohn shot herself in the mouth on Friday 5 October 1917.  "Even this did not end the torment of Sarah Aaronsohn.  While the bullet destroyed her mouth and severed her spinal cord, it missed her brain.  For four days she lingered in agony." In Spies in Palestine, James Srodes quotes the diary of Dr. Hillel Yaffe as saying that Sarah pleaded with him, "For heaven's sake, put an end to my life. I beg you, kill me…I can't suffer any longer…." Instead, Dr. Yaffee administered morphine. She died on 9 October 1917. In her last letter, she expressed her hope that her activities in Nili would bring nearer the realization of a  national home for the Jews in Eretz Israel.

Because of the Jewish views on suicide, Aaronsohn was denied a traditional burial in a Jewish cemetery. However, refusing a Jewish burial for her was unpopular. As a compromise, a small fence was placed around her grave in the cemetery (symbolically removing her grave from the surrounding hallowed ground).

Legacy
Aaronsohn was the first example of a "secular, active death of a Jewish-Zionist woman for the nation, unprecedented in both religious martyrdom and in the Zionist tradition established in Palestine." Annual pilgrimages to her tomb in Zikhron's cemetery started in 1935. After the Six-Day War of 1967, the memory of Aaronsohn and of Nili became a part of Israel's cult of heroism, officially recognized by the Labor Party and celebrated in children's literature.

See also
Balfour Declaration
Zionism
Ot me-Avshalom by Nava Macmel-Atir, 2009 (Hebrew).

References

Further reading
Aaronsohn's Maps: The Untold Story of the Man Who Might Have Created Peace in the Middle East by Patricia Goldstone (2007, Harcourt Inc.)  
Heroes of Israel by Chaim Herzog (1989, Little, Brown) 
A Spy For Freedom: The Story of Sarah Aaronsohn by Ida Cowan and Irene Gunther (1984, Lodestar Books) 
The Nili Spies by Anita Engle (1959, The Hogarth Press) 
Sarah, the Hero of Nili by Dvora Omer (1967; Hebrew)
Spies in Palestine: Love, Betrayal and the Heroic Life of Sarah Aaronsohn by James Srodes (2016, Counterpoint Press)  
A Strange Death by Hillel Halkin (2005, Weidenfeld & Nicolson) 
The Woman Who Fought an Empire: Sarah Aaronsohn and Her Nili Spy Ring by Gregory J. Wallance (2018, Potomac Books)

External links

 שרה אהרנסון Sarah Aaronsohn (izkor.gov.il)
 Prof.  Billie Melman, Sarah Aaronsohn (Jewish Women: A Comprehensive Historical Encyclopedia, Jewish Women's Archive)
 Biography on MyJewishLearning.com

1890 births
1917 deaths
1917 suicides
20th-century spies
Ashkenazi Jews in Ottoman Palestine
Executed spies
Female wartime spies
People of Romanian-Jewish descent
People from Zikhron Ya'akov
Suicides by firearm in Mandatory Palestine
Torture victims
Witnesses of the Armenian genocide
Women in war in the Middle East
Women in World War I
World War I spies for the United Kingdom
Zionist activists